Stykkishólmur is a town and municipality situated in the western part of Iceland, in the northern part of the Snæfellsnes peninsula. It is a center of services and commerce for the area. Most of the people make their living from fishing and tourism. A ferry called Baldur goes over the Breiðafjörður fjord to the Westfjords. It also is the gateway to Flatey. The origin of Stykkishólmur can be traced to its natural harbor. The location became an important trading post early in Iceland's history: the first trading post in Stykkishólmur is traced back to the mid-16th century, even before Denmark implemented the Danish–Icelandic Trade Monopoly (1602 – 1787). From that time trading has been at the heart of the settlement's history. In 1828 Árni Thorlacius built a large house for his home and companies, the Norwegian house, which has been renovated and accommodates the local museum.

Overview
The favorable position of the town was discovered early and in 1550 a trading post was founded at the site. Today, the most important sector of employment in the town after the fishing industry is summer-time tourism. There are several sightworthy wooden buildings in the town centre. Egilsenshús is a wooden house dating from 1867 which belonged to a Danish merchant.

The town was named after a small island in front of the harbor called Stykkið ("the piece"). The nearby mountain of Helgafell is the burial place of Guðrún Ósvífursdóttir, a heroine of the Icelandic sagas.

The town's former library has been restored as a public hall and contains an installation by the American artist Roni Horn.

The sports club of Stykkishólmur is called Snæfell, named after the glacier Snæfellsjökull, which is located on Snæfellsnes. The town's most popular sport is basketball.

In popular culture

In the 1986 novel Red Storm Rising, Stykkishólmur is the site of a landing by US Marines tasked with liberating Iceland from occupying Soviet forces.

Chess champion Bobby Fischer was planning on moving to Stykkishólmur before his sudden death in early 2008.

Stykkishólmur is the main setting in the short story Tussenlanding (Transfer) from the 1991 short story collection De Matador en andere verhalen by Tim Krabbé. The story features a Dutchman coming to Iceland in hope to start a relationship with an Icelandic woman he barely knows.

The town was the filming location for the depictions of Nuuk, Greenland in the 2013 movie The Secret Life of Walter Mitty.

Town festival
Every year on the second or third weekend in August, the people in Stykkishólmur celebrate the Danskir dagar ("Danish days") festival, which honors the town's historic connections with Denmark. The festival has been held every year since 1994.

Twin towns – sister cities

Stykkishólmur is twinned with:
 Drammen, Norway
 Kolding, Denmark
 Lappeenranta, Finland
 Örebro, Sweden

Climate
Stykkishólmur features a true subpolar oceanic climate, the least cold of all the polar climates, with cool summers (<10 °C, considered by most as the limit of polar climates) but with winter averages less cold than cities much further south featuring temperate continental climates, such as Chicago, Milwaukee, Toronto, or Denver, because of the moderating effect of ocean currents.

See also
List of settlements in Iceland
Snæfellsjökull

References

External links

Official website 

Municipalities of Iceland
Populated places in Western Region (Iceland)